Gangadhar or Gangadhara may refer to:

People
 Gangadhar (1936–2003), Indian actor from Karnataka
 Gangadhar Meher (1862–1924), 19th century Odia poet
 Maharaja Gangadhar Rao (1797–1853), 5th raja of Jhansi 
 Gangadhara Sastry (born 1967), Indian singer, composer from Andhra Pradesh

Places
 Gangadhar, Jhalawar district, Rajasthan
 Gangadhar, Cuttack district, Odisha
 Gangadhar, Cooch Behar district, West Bengal
 Gangadhara, Surat district, Gujarat
 Gangadhara, Karimnagar district, Telangana

Masculine given names